Antoni Zajkowski (born 5 August 1948) is a Polish former judoka who competed in the 1972 Summer Olympics.

References

1947 births
Living people
Polish male judoka
Olympic judoka of Poland
Judoka at the 1972 Summer Olympics
Olympic silver medalists for Poland
Olympic medalists in judo
People from Ełk County
Sportspeople from Warmian-Masurian Voivodeship
Medalists at the 1972 Summer Olympics
Sportspeople from Mońki